Mariah Paris Balenciaga, or simply known as Mariah, is the stage name of Elijah A. Kelly (born February 13, 1981), an American drag queen and television personality, best known for competing on the third season of RuPaul's Drag Race (2011) and the fifth season of RuPaul's Drag Race All Stars (2020). Since appearing on the show, she has been featured in a number of web series produced by World of Wonder, such as Wait, What?, Transformations, and Fashion Photo RuView. Balenciaga released her first single, "Mug 4 Dayz", on November 19, 2013.

Early life 
Kelly was born on February 13, 1982, in Gainesville, Georgia. She later moved to Atlanta when she was 19, and started doing drag in the ballroom scene, becoming a founding member of the House of Balenciaga. She is biracial.

Career 
Balenciaga was announced as one of thirteen contestants for the third season of RuPaul's Drag Race in 2011. She was eliminated in the sixth episode after losing a lip sync to "Looking for a New Love" by Jody Watley against Delta Work. In 2018, she appeared with other Drag Race alumni for the first mini challenge of season ten. She asked a viewer question to Eureka O'Hara during the season ten finale episode. She appeared as a guest for the first challenge in the premiere of season eleven of Drag Race. Balenciaga was also a drag professor for the second and third season of RuPaul's Drag U in 2011 and 2012.

Outside of Drag Race, she makes guest appearances for the WOWPresents Internet series "Fashion Photo Ruview" filling in for either Raja or Raven, reviewing looks from Drag Race alumni. Her first appearance was on June 9, 2016. She also makes recurring appearances on another WOW series, "Wait, What?" as the co-host to Kimora Blac, where they answer trivia questions. Her first appearance was in the debut episode.

Balenciaga was with other Drag Race alumni for an episode of Skin Wars in 2015. She was one of the performers for Phi Phi O'Hara's benefit show for the hurricane in Puerto Rico.

She was one of the background dancers for Miley Cyrus's 2015 VMA performance. She was a background dancer again, playing as one of the Spice Girls for Rita Ora on an episode of Lip Sync Battle in March 2018. She was a backup dancer for Lip Sync Battle again in 2019 for Nico Tortorella.

In August 2019, she was featured in Women's Wear Daily magazine, alongside Kimora Blac, Mayhem Miller, and Kameron Michaels.

In 2020, Balenciaga returned for the fifth season of RuPaul's Drag Race All Stars, placing 8th overall. Her performance in the first episode was praised for raising awareness of systemic racism and prejudice, made particularly timely in wake of the Black Lives Matter movement, and Balenciaga was even given a shoutout by current guest judge Ricky Martin for her performance.

In September 2020, Balenciaga was featured alongside many other black RuPaul's Drag Race alum in a "Stop The Racism" PSA, speaking out against toxic, racist fans within the Drag Race community.

She was a featured performer during Jennifer Lopez's performance at the 2022 iHeartRadio Music Awards.

Music 
Balenciaga released her first single, "Mug 4 Dayz", on November 19, 2013. A remix EP of the song was released on April 11, 2014. Balenciaga appeared in the music video for Pandora Boxx's "Oops I Think I Pooped" on September 24, 2018. She appeared in a music video for Lizzo's song "Juice" on April 17, 2019. She appeared in a music video for pop duo Aly & AJ's song "Star Maps" on June 12, 2019.

Discography

EPs 

Singles

As Featured Artist

Filmography

Television

Web series 
{| class="wikitable"
!Year
!Title
!Role
! style="text-align: center;" class="unsortable"| 
|-
|2014
|Transformations
| rowspan="16" | Herself
|style="text-align: center;" | 
|-
|2015
|Rooftop Lipsync
|style="text-align: center;" | 
|-
|2015-2019
|Drag Queens React
|style="text-align: center;" | 
|-
| 2016-19
| Fashion Photo RuView
|
|-
| 2016-19
| Wait, What?
| 
|-
|2017
|M.U.G.
|style="text-align: center;" | 
|-
|2017
|Spilling the Tea
|style="text-align: center;" | 
|-
|2018
|Cosmo Queens
|style="text-align: center;" | 
|-
|2019
|Wigs in a Blanket
|style="text-align: center;" | 
|-
|2019
|Bootleg Opinions
|style="text-align: center;" | 
|-
|2019-23
|The Pit Stop
|style="text-align: center;" | 
|-
|2019
|Follow Me
|style="text-align: center;" | 
|-
|2019
|Iconic
|style="text-align: center;" | 
|-
|2019
|Reading Queens
|style="text-align: center;" | 
|-
|2020
|Whatcha Packin'''
|style="text-align: center;" | 
|-
|2021
|Hey Qween!|style="text-align: center;" | 
|-
|}

 Music videos 

 References 

 External links 
 
 
 RuPaul’s DragCon 2016: Meet Mariah Balenciaga (2016),The WOW Report'', World of Wonder

1981 births
Living people
African-American drag queens
American drag queens
People from Atlanta
People from Gainesville, Georgia
Mariah Paris Balenciaga
Mariah Paris Balenciaga